Happy the Man is the second full-length album from the Dublin, Ireland folk-pop band The Guggenheim Grotto. It was originally released on October 21, 2008 by the New York-based indie label United For Opportunity.

Track listing 
"Intro" - 0:58
"Fee Da Da Dee" - 3:37
"Her Beautiful Ideas" - 4:17
"Everyman" - 3:22
"Sunshine Makes Me High" - 4:14
"The Girl With the Cards" - 3:42
"Just Not Just" - 4:02
"Nikita" - 3:54
"From the Attic" - 1:07
"Lost Forever And" - 2:50
"The Dragon" - 2:59
"Heaven Has a Heart" - 3:59

2008 albums
The Guggenheim Grotto albums